An exponential-Golomb code (or just Exp-Golomb code)  is a type of universal code.  To encode any nonnegative integer x using the exp-Golomb code:
 Write down x+1 in binary
 Count the bits written, subtract one, and write that number of starting zero bits preceding the previous bit string.

The first few values of the code are:
  0 ⇒ 1 ⇒ 1
  1 ⇒ 10 ⇒ 010
  2 ⇒ 11 ⇒ 011
  3 ⇒ 100 ⇒ 00100
  4 ⇒ 101 ⇒ 00101
  5 ⇒ 110 ⇒ 00110
  6 ⇒ 111 ⇒ 00111
  7 ⇒ 1000 ⇒ 0001000
  8 ⇒ 1001 ⇒ 0001001
 ...

In the above examples, consider the case 3. For 3,  x+1 = 3 + 1 = 4. 4 in binary is '100'. '100' has 3 bits, and 3-1 = 2. Hence add 2 zeros before '100', which is '00100'

Similarly, consider 8. '8 + 1' in binary is '1001'.  '1001' has 4 bits, and 4-1 is 3. Hence add 3 zeros before 1001, which is '0001001'. 

This is identical to the Elias gamma code of x+1, allowing it to encode 0.

Extension to negative numbers
Exp-Golomb coding is used in the H.264/MPEG-4 AVC and H.265 High Efficiency Video Coding video compression standards, in which there is also a variation for the coding of signed numbers by assigning the value 0 to the binary codeword '0' and assigning subsequent codewords to input values of increasing magnitude (and alternating sign, if the field can contain a negative number):
  0 ⇒ 0 ⇒ 1 ⇒ 1
  1 ⇒ 1 ⇒ 10 ⇒ 010
 −1 ⇒ 2 ⇒ 11 ⇒ 011
  2 ⇒ 3 ⇒ 100 ⇒ 00100
 −2 ⇒ 4 ⇒ 101 ⇒ 00101
  3 ⇒ 5 ⇒ 110 ⇒ 00110
 −3 ⇒ 6 ⇒ 111 ⇒ 00111
  4 ⇒ 7 ⇒ 1000 ⇒ 0001000
 −4 ⇒ 8 ⇒ 1001 ⇒ 0001001
 ...

In other words, a non-positive integer x≤0 is mapped to an even integer −2x, while a positive integer x>0 is mapped to an odd integer 2x−1.

Exp-Golomb coding is also used in the Dirac video codec.

Generalization to order k
To encode larger numbers in fewer bits (at the expense of using more bits to encode smaller numbers), this can be generalized using a nonnegative integer parameter  k.  To encode a nonnegative integer x in an order-k exp-Golomb code:
 Encode ⌊x/2k⌋ using order-0 exp-Golomb code described above, then
 Encode x mod 2k in binary
An equivalent way of expressing this is:
 Encode x+2k−1 using the order-0 exp-Golomb code (i.e. encode x+2k using the Elias gamma code), then
 Delete k leading zero bits from the encoding result

See also
Elias gamma (γ) coding
Elias delta (δ) coding
Elias omega (ω) coding
Universal code

References

Numeral systems
Lossless compression algorithms